Norman Page (born in Nottingham, Nottinghamshiredied 4 July 1935 in London) was a British actor. He is best known for his portrayal of David Lloyd George, Prime Minister during the First World War, in the 1918 film The Life Story of David Lloyd George, which is believed to be the first ever feature length political biopic.

Selected filmography
 The Life Story of David Lloyd George (1918)
 The Elusive Pimpernel (1919)
 Bleak House (1920)
 The Yellow Claw (1921)
 The Card (1922)
 Out to Win (1923)
 The Sign of Four (1923)

References

External links
 

Year of birth unknown
1935 deaths
English male film actors
English male silent film actors
Actors from Nottingham
Male actors from Nottinghamshire
20th-century English male actors
1876 births